New Albany High School is a public high school located in New Albany, Indiana, United States. Founded on October 3, 1853. New Albany High school is the oldest public high school in the state of Indiana. The school was closed from 1859 to 1864 to be made into a hospital for union soldiers during the  American Civil War. The school was the first FM high school radio station (88.1) to be licensed by the Federal Communications Commission (FCC) and has had its own Public-access television cable TV channel WNAS-TV since 1980. It is a part of the New Albany-Floyd County Consolidated School Corporation.

The school serves New Albany and surrounding unincorporated areas.

History

Established as Scribner High School in 1853, it was originally located on West Fourth and Spring Street. It was renamed to New Albany High School the same year under James Wood. After one year after its opening, the school was temporarily closed on March 2, 1854, by the Indiana Supreme Court after the court ruled that its administration was allocating funds unlawfully. It was reopened until it was again closed in 1859, when the United States Army converted the school into a hospital for soldiers serving in the American Civil War.

Prior to the Conclusion of the American Civil War, Scribner High School reopened for academic usage; enrolling students in September 1864. In 1870, the high school established two separate high schools; with the original building being converted into an All Boys' High School, while a secondary building on Spring Street and Bank Street was designated as the Female High School. In 1880, the schools were consolidated; with all students beginning attendance solely at the former Female High School. In 1891 the first-ever school newspaper was started called the High School Herald.

In 1902, the site at Bank Street and Spring Street was torn down for the construction of the Carnegie Library Building. From 1902 to 1903, the High School temporarily held classes at the Frisbee House on East Sixth and Spring Street. It temporarily relocated once again at the end of academic sessions in 1903, where the school moved to the DePauw college building at East Main and Ninth Street. In 1905, relocation of the high school ceased with the completion of a new building on East Sixth and Spring Street.

In 1927, the current building located on Vincennes Street was constructed; with classes relocating once again. Additions to the building in 1942 allowed for increased space for administrative usage; along with facilities to host the countries first high school radio program. Several additions continued, with a student theater being added in 1978, a new library, swimming pool and laboratories between the years of 1979 and 1982. In 1998, renovations began on the school, bringing additions such as its current athletic offices, clinic, bookstore, cafeteria, kitchen area, auditorium and auxiliary gym.

Athletics
New Albany has won the following IHSAA state championships:
Basketball
Boys - 1973, 2016
Girls - 1999
Softball - 1987
Tennis
Boys - 1967

Media
WNAS, 88.1 FM, is a student-run non-commercial radio station.

Notable alumni and faculty

Alumni
 James W. Dunbar - U.S. Representative
 Rob Conway – professional wrestler 
 Josh Dallas – actor
 Joe Dean – college basketball player, university athletic director, sports broadcaster
 Billy Herman – Major League Baseball player
 Karen Kamensek – Grammy Winning Orchestral and Operatic Conductor
 Max Macon – Major League Baseball player
 Sherman Minton – United States Senator and an associate Justice of the Supreme Court of the United States
 William Vaughn Moody – dramatist and poet
 Charles A. Prosser – educator and politician
 Mike Sodrel –United States Representative
 Camille Wright – Olympic swimmer
 Fuzzy Zoeller – PGA golfer
Romeo Langford – basketball player
 Josh Rogers - MLB pitcher

Faculty
 Edwin Hubble - Astronomer, after whom the Hubble Space Telescope is named. He taught physics and Spanish and served as basketball coach at the school in the early 20th century

See also
 List of high schools in Indiana

References

 East Spring Street Neighborhood Association Inc - History of New Albany

External links

Educational institutions established in 1853
Public high schools in Indiana
Buildings and structures in New Albany, Indiana
Former Southern Indiana Athletic Conference members
Schools in Floyd County, Indiana
1853 establishments in Indiana